The 2000 San Francisco Board of Supervisors elections occurred on November 7, 2000, with a runoff election held on December 12, 2000. All eleven seats were contested. Elections to odd-numbered districts were to four-year terms, while elections to even-numbered districts were to transitional two-year terms, then four-year terms thereafter.

This election was the first following the reintroduction of electoral districts for the Board of Supervisors in 2000; previously, except for a short period of time, supervisors were elected at-large. The first districts, implemented in 1977, saw Harvey Milk and Dan White attain office; the districts were abolished in 1980 in the wake of Milk's assassination by White.

Municipal elections in California are officially non-partisan, though most candidates in San Francisco do receive funding and support from various political parties.


Results

District 1 

This district consists of the Richmond District. Incumbent supervisor Michael Yaki was defeated by Jake McGoldrick in the runoff.

District 2 

District 2 consists of the Marina, Pacific Heights, the Presidio, part of Russian Hill, and Sea Cliff. Incumbent supervisor Gavin Newsom won reelection unopposed.

District 3 

District 3 consists of the northeastern corner of San Francisco, including Chinatown, the Financial District, Fisherman's Wharf, Nob Hill, North Beach, and Telegraph Hill. Incumbent supervisor Alicia Becerril was defeated in the general election, with Aaron Peskin winning the runoff against Lawrence Wong.

District 4 

District 4 consists primarily of the Sunset district. Incumbent supervisor Leland Yee won reelection.

District 5 

District 5 consists of the Fillmore, Haight-Ashbury, Hayes Valley, Japantown, UCSF, and the Western Addition. Matt Gonzalez won this open seat after a runoff against Juanita Owens.

District 6 

District 6 consists of Alcatraz Island, Civic Center, Mission Bay, South of Market, the Tenderloin, Treasure Island, and Yerba Buena Island. Chris Daly won this open seat after a runoff against Chris M. Dittenhafer.

District 7 

District 7 consists of City College, Forest Hill, Lake Merced, Mount Davidson, Parkmerced, San Francisco State University, St. Francis Wood, and Twin Peaks. Incumbent supervisor Mabel Teng was defeated in the runoff against Tony Hall.

District 8 

District 8 consists of The Castro, Diamond Heights, Duboce Triangle, Eureka Valley, Glen Park, and Noe Valley. Incumbent supervisor Mark Leno won reelection after a runoff against Eileen Hansen.

District 9 

District 9 consists of Bernal Heights and the Inner Mission. Incumbent supervisor Tom Ammiano was reelected.

District 10 

District 10 consists of Bayview-Hunters Point, McLaren Park, Portola, Potrero Hill, and Visitacion Valley. Sophie Maxwell won this open seat after a runoff against Linda Richardson.

District 11 

District 11 consists of the Excelsior District, Ingleside, Oceanview, and Outer Mission. Incumbent supervisor Amos Brown was defeated in the runoff against Gerardo Sandoval.

References

External links 
City and County of San Francisco Department of Elections

San Francisco Board of Supervisors
Board of Supervisors 2000
Election Board of Supervisors
San Francisco Board of Supervisors